Keyboard Fantasies: The Beverly Glenn-Copeland Story is a 2019 British documentary film about Beverly Glenn-Copeland, directed by Posy Dixon. The film "details the Black trans musician's rise to fame" over the previous few years. It includes talking heads interviews with Copeland and his collaborators, documentary footage and live performances.

See also
Keyboard Fantasies

References

External links

Documentary films about singers
2019 independent films
British documentary films
2010s English-language films
2010s British films